Cecil Campbell may refer to:

 Prince Buster (Cecil Bustamente Campbell, 1938–2016), Jamaican ska/rocksteady singer
 Ini Kamoze (Cecil Campbell, born 1957), Jamaican reggae singer
 Terror Fabulous (Cecil Campbell, born 1974), Jamaican dancehall deejay
 Cecil Campbell (tennis) (1891–1952), amateur Irish tennis player